The Garden is the first album by Australian singer Merril Bainbridge, released in Australia on 31 July 1995 (see 1995 in music) by Gotham Records. The album has a main genre of alternative pop songs — some written by Bainbridge herself, Owen Bolwell, Stan Paulzen (both of Tlot Tlot) and Siew. The Garden debuted inside the top ten on the Australian ARIA Albums Chart and is her highest selling album to date, being certified double platinum by ARIA. The album nominated Bainbridge for eight awards throughout the 1995 and the 1996 ARIA Awards including; "Best Pop Release", "Breakthrough Artist - Single", "Best New Talent", "Best Female Artist", "Single of the Year", "Breakthrough Artist - Album", "Highest Selling Single" and "Highest Selling Album".

Commercial performance and singles
The Garden was commercially successful in Australia and had minor success in New Zealand and the United States. In mid-August 1995, it debuted at number five on the Australian ARIA Albums Chart.  The album dropped off the chart after five months spending a total of twenty-two weeks on the chart. The Australian Recording Industry Association awarded the album a double platinum certification for shipping 140,000 copies and became the twenty-seventh highest selling album in Australia for 1995. At the 1996 ARIA Awards, the album was nominated for "Breakthrough Artist - Album" and "Highest Selling Album", but lost to Tu-Plang by Regurgitator and Don't Ask by Tina Arena respectively. In New Zealand, The Garden debuted at number thirty-four and spent two weeks on the chart.

"Mouth", the first single, became Bainbridge's most-successful single release, peaking at  number-one on the Australian ARIA Singles Chart and top five on the U.S. Billboard Hot 100. Written by Bainbridge herself, it is a bubblegum pop song about relationship — "sometimes you feel you're in control and the next thing, you're insecure." The single was released in October 1994 and failed to chart.  When it was re-issued in 1995 it gained success, being certified platinum by ARIA and becoming the fourth highest selling single in Australia for 1995. The song was nominated for "Best Pop Release", "Breakthrough Artist - Single" and "Single of the Year" at the 1995 ARIA Awards. The second single "Under the Water" was written by Owen Bolwell and Stanley Paulzen in 1990. It became Bainbridge's second top ten hit in Australia. The song was nominated for "Highest Selling Single" at the 1996 ARIA Awards, but lost to "Let's Groove" by CDB. The third and fourth singles, "Power of One" and "Sleeping Dogs", had minor success on the chart peaking at number twenty-one and fifty-five respectively.

"Sleeping Dogs" uses a coda that was previously used at the end of the track "Just Can't Get Enough" on Tlot Tlot's album The Live Set - Volume 1.

Track listing

In late 1996, the album was re-released in Australia with a bonus disc containing several music videos and three remixes.

Charts

Year-end charts

Certifications

Release history

Personnel

Merril Bainbridge — background vocals, vocal arrangement
Owen Bolwell — electric guitar, keyboards, programming, producer, engineer
Angus Burchall — percussion, drums
Jason Catherine — vocal percussion (track 4)
Gary Costello — double bass (track 3)
Mark Domoney — acoustic guitar
Tony Espie — mixing (tracks 1, 2, 5, 7, 9 and 11)
Ross Fraser — mixing (tracks 4 and 12)
Aaron Humphries — assistant engineer
Chong Lim — piano (tracks 6 and 12)

Michael Losin — violin (tracks 8 and 11)
Brian Marsh — engineer
Roger McLachlan — bass
Sam Melamed — electric guitar, keyboards, programming, producer, engineer, mixing
Greg O'Connor — graphic design
Steve O'Hara — strings (tracks 1 and 5)
Adrienne Overall — photography
Siew — keyboards, programming, producer.
Mark Wallace — accordion (track 1)
Chris Wilson — harmonica, vocals (track 2)

References

1995 debut albums
Gotham Records albums
Merril Bainbridge albums